David Baszucki (born January 20, 1963), also known by his Roblox username builderman, is a Canadian-born American entrepreneur, engineer, and software developer. He is best known as the co-founder (along with Erik Cassel) and CEO of Roblox Corporation. He previously co-founded and served as the CEO of Knowledge Revolution, which was acquired by MSC Software in December 1998.

Early life and education 
Baszucki was born on January 20, 1963, in Canada. He grew up in Eden Prairie, Minnesota. As a child, he was interested in dirt bikes, go-karts, and science fiction. He attended Eden Prairie High School in Eden Prairie, Minnesota, where he was the captain of his high school TV quiz team. He later went on to host his own talk radio show for KSCO Radio Santa Cruz from February to July 2003. Baszucki studied engineering and computer science at Stanford University. While there, he did a summer internship at General Motors where he worked in a lab focused on controlling car engines with software. He graduated in 1985 as a General Motors Scholar in electrical engineering.

Career

Knowledge Revolution 
In the late 1980s, Baszucki, together with his brother Greg Baszucki, founded the company Knowledge Revolution and developed and distributed a simulation called "Interactive Physics", which was designed as an educational supplement that would allow the creation of 2D physics experiments.

As a follow-up to Interactive Physics, Knowledge Revolution launched the mechanical design software Working Model in the early 1990s.

In December 1998, Knowledge Revolution was acquired by MSC Software, a simulation software company based in Newport Beach, California, for $20 million. Baszucki was named vice president and general manager of MSC Software from 2000 to 2002, but he left to establish Baszucki & Associates, an angel investment firm. Baszucki led Baszucki & Associates from 2003 to 2004. While an investor, he provided seed funding to  Friendster, a social networking service.

Roblox 

In 2004, Baszucki, along with Erik Cassel – who worked as Baszucki's VP of Engineering for Interactive Physics – began working on an early prototype of Roblox under the working title DynaBlocks. It was later renamed Roblox, a portmanteau of "robots" and "blocks", in 2005. The website officially launched in 2006. In a June 2016 interview with Forbes, Baszucki stated that the idea for Roblox was inspired by the success of his Interactive Physics and Working Model software applications, especially among young students.

Baszucki owns a roughly 13% stake in the Roblox Corporation, the company that owns Roblox, a stake estimated to be worth roughly $470 million as of 2020.  He said he would donate any future compensation he earns from Roblox's listing on the New York Stock Exchange for philanthropic purposes. In December 2021, a New York Times investigation alleged that he and his relatives used a tax break intended for small business investors in order to legally avoid tens of millions of dollars in capital gains taxes. According to Business Insider, Baszucki was the seventh-highest-paid CEO in 2021, making $232.8 million.

Other activities 
In March 2021, after Roblox's listing on the New York Stock Exchange, Baszucki and his wife launched the Baszucki Group, a philanthropic organisation, and started the Baszucki Brain Research Fund to provide grants to bipolar research programs.In December 2021, the University of California, San Francisco launched the Baszucki Lymphoma Therapeutics Initiative, with $6 million in donations from Baszucki over five years, to increase the effectiveness and availability of chimeric antigen receptor T-cell therapy for lymphoma patients. In September 2022, Baszucki, Google cofounder Sergey Brin, and Keystone Capital chairman Kent Dauten donated a combined $150 million toward bipolar disorder research and treatment.

Personal life
Baszucki lives in the San Francisco Bay Area with his wife, novelist Jan Ellison, and their four children.

References

Further reading 
 

1963 births
Living people
American computer programmers
Businesspeople from San Francisco
Canadian expatriates in the United States
Roblox
Stanford University people